Bethel ("House of El" or "House of God", also transliterated Beth El, Beth-El, Beit El;) was an ancient Israelite sanctuary frequently mentioned in the Hebrew Bible.

Bethel is first referred to in the bible as being near where Abram pitched his tent. Later, Bethel is mentioned as the location where Jacob dreams of a ladder leading to heaven, and which he therefore named Bethel, "House of God". The name is further used for a border city located between the territory of the Israelite tribe of Benjamin and that of the tribe of Ephraim, which first belonged to the Benjaminites and was later conquered by the Ephraimites. In the 4th century CE, Eusebius of Caesarea and Jerome described Bethel as a small village that lay 12 Roman miles north of Jerusalem, to the right or east of the road leading to Neapolis.

In 1977, the biblical name was applied to the Israeli settlement of Beit El, founded nearby. In several countries—particularly in the United States—the name has been given to various locations (see Bethel (disambiguation)).

Identification

Beitin
Edward Robinson identified the Arab village of Beitin in the West Bank with ancient Bethel in Biblical Researches in Palestine, 1838–52. He based this assessment on its fitting the location described in earlier texts, and on the philological similarities between the modern and ancient name, arguing that the replacement of the Hebrew el with the Arabic in was not unusual. Most academics continue to identify Bethel with Beitin.

El-Bireh
David Palmer Livingston contradicts this view, based on the lack of positive identification by means of inscriptions and relying on the distance from Jerusalem according to Eusebius and Jerome. He identifies Bethel with El-Bireh, suggesting that Beitin might be biblical Ophrah; however, Ophrah is commonly identified with the nearby village of Taybeh.

In the Hebrew Bible

Book of Genesis
Bethel is mentioned several times in Genesis. It is said to be close to the Ai and just to the west of it. Another account, from  repeats the covenant with God and the naming of the place (as El-Bethel), and makes this the site of Jacob's own change of name to Israel. Both versions state that the original name of the place was Luz, a Canaanite name.

Book of Joshua
At  it is again said to be next to Luz, near Jericho, and part of the territory of the descendants of Joseph (that is Manasseh and Ephraim, cf. ).

Book of Judges
In the book of  the descendants of Joseph capture the city of Bethel, which again is said to have previously been called Luz.

At , where the Hebrew Beth-El is translated in the King James Version as the 'House of God,' the people of Israel go to Bethel to ask counsel of God when they are planning to attack the Benjaminites at the battle of Gibeah. They make a second visit after losing the battle. Bethel was evidently already an important religious centre at this time; it was so important, in fact, that the Ark of the Covenant was kept there, under the care of Phinehas the grandson of Aaron ( f). At , Bethel is said to be south of Shiloh.

Book of Samuel

In the book , it is said that the prophet Samuel, who resided at Ramah, used to make a yearly circuit of Bethel, Gilgal and Mizpah to judge Israel. At I Samuel 10:3, Samuel tells Saul to go to Bethel to visit the 'Hill of God,' where he will meet a group of prophets coming down from the high place with a 'psaltery, and a tabret, and a pipe, and a harp.' It appears that there was a Philistine garrison there at that time.

First Book of Kings
After the kingdom of Israel was split into two kingdoms on the death of King Solomon (c.931 BC), Jeroboam, the first king of the northern Kingdom of Israel, made two golden calves ( ff) and set one up in Bethel, and the other in Dan in the far north of his kingdom. This was apparently to make it unnecessary for the people of Israel to have to go to Jerusalem to worship in the temple there. It seems that this action provoked the hostility of the Judaeans. A story is told at  ff of how a man from Judah visited the shrine at Bethel and prophesied that it would eventually be destroyed by Josiah.

Second Book of Kings
According to ff, the prophets Elijah and Elisha visited Bethel on a journey from Gilgal to Jericho shortly before Elijah was taken up to heaven alive. Later, when Elisha returned alone to Bethel, he was taunted by some young men (not 'young boys' as it is translated in some English Bibles) as he climbed up to the shrine, and cursed them; whereupon 42 of the young men were mauled by bears ( ff).

Bethel is next mentioned in connection with the tenth king of Israel, Jehu (c. 842-815 BC). Despite his killing of the prophets of Baal and destruction of their temple, it is said that Jehu continued to tolerate the presence of the golden calves in Bethel and Dan. The shrine at Bethel apparently avoided destruction in the Assyrian invasions of the Kingdom of Israel in c. 740 and 722, but was finally completely destroyed by King Josiah of Judah (c. 640-609 BC).

Books of Ezra and Nehemiah

Books of Amos, Hosea and Jeremiah
The shrine is mentioned with disapproval by the prophet Amos (c. 750):

A few years later, the prophet Hosea (8th century BC) speaks (at least according to modern translations) of the "wickedness" of Bethel and Jeremiah (6th century BC) speaks of the "shame" which it brought on Israel.  describes how the Israelites are abandoning Adonai for the worship of Baal, and accuses them of making or using images for 'idol' worship. Chief among these, it appears, was the image of the bull at Bethel, which by the time of Hosea was being worshipped as an image of Baal.

Archaeology

Bronze Age

Iron Age

Hellenistic, Roman, Byzantine and medieval periods 
Bethel/Beitin was again inhabited and fortified by Bacchides the Syrian in the time of the Maccabees. Josephus tells us that Bethel was captured by Vespasian. Robinson notes that after the writings of Eusebius and Jerome, he found no further references to Bethel in the written historical record. However, he notes that the ruins at Beitin are greater than those of a village and seem to have undergone expansion after the time of Jerome, noting also the presence of what appear to be ruins of churches from the Middle Ages. The town appears on the 6th century Madaba Map as "Louza, also known as Bethel (Bethēl)".

19th century

Bethel ("House of God") is mentioned in the Bible as the site where Jacob slept and dreamed of angels going up and down a ladder (Genesis 28:19). Some scholars identify Beit El with the site of the biblical Bethel. The first to establish the village of Beitin as the site of Bethel was Edward Robinson, in 1838. Henry Baker Tristram repeated this claim. J. J. Bimson and David Livingston proposed el-Bireh as the site of Bethel, a view rejected by Jules Francis Gomes, who wrote that "The voices of Livingston and Bimson have hardly been taken seriously by those who worked on the excavations of Bethel."

See also
Bayt Allah or Beytullah, another name for the Muslim Kaaba of Mecca
Bethel (god), name of a god or an aspect of a god from the Assyrian to Hellenistic periods

References

Bibliography

 
 Encyclopædia Britannica 2007 Ultimate Reference Suite

External links
 

Ancient Israel and Judah
Former populated places in Southwest Asia
Hebrew language
Kingdom of Israel (Samaria)
Golden calf
Hebrew Bible cities